The Long March is a novella by William Styron, first published serially in 1952 in Discovery. and by Random House as a Modern Library Paperback in 1956.

Subject
It tells of an overnight thirty-six mile forced march back to base at a US Marine training camp in the Carolinas, the chief protagonists being ageing reservists Lieutenant Culver and his friend Captain Mannix, who have been called up due to the threat of the Korean War. Eight of their colleagues had, earlier that day, been killed by misfired mortar shells, adding to the absurdity of their ordeal.

Inspiration
Styron himself was called up in response to the Korean War and a forced march he undertook at Camp Lejeune in Jacksonville, North Carolina provided the inspiration for the story.

Theme
Writing in The Guardian, James Campbell explains, "The book expresses Styron's dislike of the military experience and must originally have appeared as a reproof to more bullish colleagues such as Norman Mailer and James Jones who, while exposing the brutality of battle, did so in such a way as to aggrandise it. "None of that Hemingway crap for me," says the hero of The Long March, Captain Mannix, with whom Styron has identified himself."

References

External links
Tom Conoboy's Writing Blog: The Long March by William Styron

American novellas
1952 American novels
Random House books
Novels by William Styron
Novels about the United States Marine Corps
Anti-war novels
Novels first published in serial form